Anthony Vaccarello (born 18 January 1982) is an Italian fashion designer. He is the current creative director of Yves Saint Laurent. Prior to this position, he was creative director at Versus Versace. He has also designed his own eponymous line.

Early life and education
Vaccarello was born on 18 January 1982 in Brussels, Belgium. He is the only child of Italian parents; his father worked as a cartongesso maker, and his mother was an office-worker.

Vaccarello completed one year of law school before enrolling at La Cambre in 2000 to study sculpture. Switching to a fashion course at the same location, he graduated in 2006 with honors. He was inspired to switch focus in school by Rei Kawakubo and Azzedine Alaïa. His graduate collection was presented at the fashion festival in Hyères in Southern France. Post the presentation, Karl Lagerfeld offered him a position in fur design at Fendi.

Career 
Vaccarello worked under Karl Lagerfeld at Fendi for two years, specialising in fur designs. In January 2009, he moved back to Paris, making his eponymous ready-to-wear collection debut, showing five looks in the window of the Parisian boutique Maria Luisa. The collection won the 2011 ANDAM prize. The model Anja Rubik wore a revealing white Vaccarello dress from the same collection to the 2012 Met Gala. After an introduction to Lou Doillon at a dinner party, Doillon modelled in Vaccarello's lookbook, shot in a parking garage.

By September 2014, Vaccarello was creating a capsule collection for Versus Versace. Vaccarello spent three years working for Versace, initially as a consultant and, since 2015, as creative director. He went on to create several collections for Versus until in April 2016 when it was announced that he had been appointed creative director of Saint Laurent Paris. During his first full year as creative designer at Saint Laurent, the company's income had increased by 25.3 percent in revenue over 2016.

Personal life 
He and Anja Rubik are close friends. She agreed to walk in his A/W 2012 show.

Vacarrello is married to Arnaud Michaux, who works with him in the YSL atelier. In spring 2021, the couple announced on his Instagram account that they have a child named Luca.

Awards and honors 
In July 2011, he won the ANDAM Fashion Award and a €200,000 endowment.

References 

1982 births
Belgian fashion designers
LGBT fashion designers
Living people
Artists from Brussels
High fashion brands
Belgian people of Italian descent